
Year 225 (CCXXV) was a common year starting on Saturday (link will display the full calendar) of the Julian calendar. At the time, it was known as the Year of the Consulship of Fuscus and Domitius (or, less frequently, year 978 Ab urbe condita). The denomination 225 for this year has been used since the early medieval period, when the Anno Domini calendar era became the prevalent method in Europe for naming years.

Events 
 By place 

 Roman Empire 
 Emperor Alexander Severus marries Sallustia Orbiana, and possibly raises her father Seius Sallustius to the rank of Caesar.

 By topic 

 Art and Science 
 The first Christian paintings appear in Rome, decorating the Catacombs.

Births 
 January 20 – Gordian III, Roman emperor (d. 244)
 December 31 – Lawrence, Christian martyr (d. 258)
 Trieu Thi Trinh, Vietnamese female warrior (d. 248)
 Zhong Hui, Chinese general and politician (d. 264)

Deaths 
 Gaius Vettius Gratus Sabinianus, Roman consul
 Gong Lu, Chinese official and politician (b. 195)
 Sun Shao, Chinese official and chancellor (b. 163)
 Xiahou Shang, Chinese general and politician

References